Hieronymus van Bosch may refer to:
 Hieronymus de Bosch (1740–1811), Latin scholar and poet from the Netherlands
 Hieronymus Bosch (1450–1516), Dutch painter